Bedbury is a surname. Notable people with the surname include: 

Floyd Bedbury (1937–2011), American speed skater
Scott Bedbury (born 1957), American branding consultant